Joshua Hatton (8 June 1850 in Chesterfield, Derbyshire – 1920) was an English writer, poet and editor, the brother of Joseph Hatton, Editor of The People). His exact date of death in late 1920 is uncertain, but it was reported at the beginning of 1921. He was aged 70.

Reputation
Hatton commonly used the pseudonym Guy Roslyn, although he is more often regarded by that name as a bogus biographer reduced to poverty and begging from the subjects of his biographies in his later life.

Works
Poetry and novels
Daphnis the Unfaithful: a poetic romance, London: John Camden Hotten, 1870
George Eliot in Derbyshire. Gossip on passages and characters in her novels, London, 1876
Lyrics and Landscapes, etc., London/Perth, 1878
Village Verses, etc., London/Plymouth, 1876

Editor
The Biograph, and Review, London: E. W. Allen, 1879–1882
The New Monthly Magazine and Literary Journal, London: Henry Colburn and Co., to 1882

References

External links

British writers
1850 births
1921 deaths